Changing Lives Through Literature (CLTL) is a bibliotherapy program that offers alternative probation sentences to offenders.  The program was created in 1991 by Robert Waxler, an English professor at the University of Massachusetts Dartmouth, and Superior Court Judge Robert Kane.  At a cost of less than $500 a person, proponents say that CLTL saves the government tens of thousands of dollars when compared with the cost of housing an inmate for a lifetime at an annual rate of $30,000.  The program is said to help reduce the recidivism rate among certain segments of the prison population.  Former offenders credit the program for giving them a second chance.

Several studies of the CLTL program have been published. A longitudinal study by Jarjoura & Krumholz (1998) found favorable results, with lower rates of recidivism than those in a comparison, non-program group.  Liberal and conservative penal systems throughout the U.S., including Arizona, California, Connecticut, Florida, Illinois, Indiana, Kansas, Maine, Massachusetts, New York, Rhode Island, Texas, and Virginia, have embraced the program. CLTL was brought to Manchester, England as part of the "Stories Connect" program run by the Writers in Prison Network.

The program has received a New England Board of Higher Education award for excellence and an Exemplary Education Grant from the National Endowment for the Humanities.

History

In the 1980s, English professor Robert Waxler attended a summer seminar about literature and society at Princeton University.  They discussed the purpose of literature in a technological society.  What role would literature play in the future?  Waxler felt strongly that "literature was the most important tool we had to humanize ourselves and society".  A decade later, Waxler began to develop this concept into an experimental hypothesis.  He contacted his friend and tennis partner, Judge Robert Kane, and proposed an idea: instead of sending criminals to jail who might otherwise go through the revolving door of criminal justice—sentence them to a discussion group run by Waxler at the University of Massachusetts, Dartmouth.  "It was...a chance to demonstrate that literature did have the power to change lives", recalls Waxler.

The Changing Lives Through Literature (CLTL) program first began in the fall of 1991 at the University of Massachusetts Dartmouth, with Robert Waxler, Judge Robert Kane, and probation officer Wayne St. Pierre.  Initial applicants were male probationers from New Bedford who were offered the opportunity to participate in the program.  If they successfully completed the program, six-months would be reduced from their probation.  In 1992, Jean Trounstine cofounded the first CLTL program for women.  The success of CLTL has led to its adoption in at least 12 other states.  The program is also taught in Manchester, England.

Requirements
Potential participants, including juveniles and adults, must demonstrate basic literacy, equivalent to the reading level of eighth grade, and the desire to improve their lives.  In some difficult cases, the literacy requirement might be loosened to allow for motivated individuals.  Although the majority of probationers have had to deal with substance abuse issues in the past, those currently dealing with substance abuse issues or convicted of sex offenses are not allowed to participate in the program.

The CLTL program is considered challenging and is taken seriously by the class and its teachers.  Students who are absent from class or fail to complete their homework can be sent back to jail.  High attrition rates can occur in some cases.

Programs

In 2000, British writer Mary Stephenson modeled her "Stories Connect" group in UK prisons after CLTL.

The CLTL program received the New England Board of Higher Education award for excellence in 2004.  The National Endowment for the Humanities awarded the program a grant in 2003 which enabled them to create a website.

The "Read To Succeed" program for juvenile offenders, a cooperation between the Johnson County Library, district court, school district, and department of corrections in Johnson County, Kansas, was based on the CLTL program.  The library received the 2005 National Award for Museum and Library Service for its work.  U.S. Senator Sam Brownback said "the library merits commendation for its Changing Lives Through Literature program, which has dramatically reduced the recidivism rate among probationary teens."

In 2007, Fairfax County, Virginia, implemented the CLTL program. For their work, the received an Outstanding Achievement in Local Government Innovation Award and a National Association of Counties (NACo) Achievement Award in 2008.

By 2015, a Massachusetts Trial Court Grant funded program for the Girls Group, an alternative dispute resolution program which incorporated CLTL. Advocate and grant writer Shea Kiley, secured additional funding in 2016, for the continued expansion of the Girls Group allowing continued support of the CLTL model. Girls Group operates at the New Bedford Juvenile Court with leadership from probation officer Estella Rebeiro and court clinician Ann Condon. Additional guidance is coordinated with oversight by New Bedford Chief of Police – Joseph C. Cordeiro, who continues the "CITY OF ONE" mission in this community collaboration.

Books
Sample texts used in the CLTL program include books tailored for segregated men and women's classes.  Gender segregation was the preferred teaching environment chosen by participants, including both offenders and professors.

Men's program
Animal Farm
Deliverance
Greasy Lake
Of Mice and Men
The Old Man and the Sea
The Sea-Wolf
Sonny's Blues
Greasy Lake
A Chance in the World

Women's program
Bastard Out of Carolina
The Bean Trees
The Bluest Eye
Dinner at the Homesick Restaurant
The House on Mango Street
Their Eyes Were Watching God
To Kill a Mockingbird
Night
Where Are You Going, Where Have You Been?

Results
Studies suggest that offenders who participate in the CLTL program are less likely to reoffend.

In 1998, criminologist G. Roger Jarjoura at Indiana University and law and society scholar Susan T. Krumholz of the University of Massachusetts Dartmouth published a longitudinal study focusing on the first CLTL program in New Bedford, Massachusetts from 1993.  They tested two groups, one in CLTL and another in a competing program group.  In the CLTL group, 18% committed crimes compared to 42% in the non-CLTL group.

See also
Criminal sentencing in the United States
Law and literature
Neurophilosophy
Read to Succeed
Writing for Our Lives
Jean Trounstine

Notes

References

Allen, A. (2011). "Can writing stop prisoners reoffending?" BBC News.
Barker, A. (2010). "Novel approach: reading courses as an alternative to prison". The Guardian.
Basbanes, N. A. (2006). "Reaching Out". Every Book Its Reader: The Power of the Printed Word to Stir the World. HarperCollins. .
Edwards, B. (2010, November 16). "Changing Lives Through Literature".  The Bob Edwards Show.
Jablecki, L. T. (1998). "Changing lives through literature". Federal Probation, 62 (1), 32. 
Jarjoura, G. R., Krumholz, S. T. (1998) Combining Bibliotherapy and Positive Role Modeling as an Alternative to Incarceration. Journal of Offender Rehabilitation. 28 (1-2), 127-139. 
Major, S. (2002, March 31). Changing Lives Through Literature. Counselor. Health Communications, Inc.
Prieto, C. (2011). "Professor sees link in psychology, literature". Lehigh University.
Stellabotte, R. (2003). "Reading Sentences: Judge Joseph Dever and Changing Lives Through Literature". Fordham Magazine (Fordham University), 24-27.
Stephenson, M. (2010). "Connected by Stories". InsideTime (New Bridge) (128). 
Stoehr, T. (March–April 2005). Is it a Crime to Be Illiterate? Changing Lives through Literature: Offenders Program Report. Change. Heldref Publications.  37 (2), 28-35.   
Taylor, C. (October 18, 2010). Reading programs offer alternative to jail. County News.  National Association of Counties. 42(19).
Trounstine, J. R. (2000). Lynn-Lowell Women's Program Seminar Syllabus. Middlesex Community College. Changing Lives Through Literature.
Trounstine, J. R. (2001). Shakespeare Behind Bars. New York: St. Martin's Press. .
Trounstine, J. R.; R. P. Waxler (2005). Finding a Voice: The Practice of Changing Lives Through Literature. University of Michigan Press. .
Waxler, R. P., Trounstine, J.R. ed. (1999). Changing Lives Through Literature. Notre Dame, Indiana: University of Notre Dame Press. .
Waxler, R. P., Hall, M. P. (2011). Transforming Literacy: Changing Lives Through Reading and Writing. Emerald Group Publishing. .

Further reading

Abraham, Y. (2011). "A different read on life". The Boston Globe.
Feldman, C. (2001, July 8). Probationers use books to find a new future. Houston Chronicle.
Fessler, V., Strotman, K., Bangs, P. (2009). "Changing Lives Through Literature in the Public Library. Virginia Libraries. 55(4), 11-14. 
Gonzalves, S. (2007, Fall). License to dream. UMass Dartmouth. New Bedford, MA. pp. 13-15.
Jablecki, L. T. (Nov/Dec 2005). Changing the Lives of Prisoners: A New Agenda. Humanist. 65(6), 30-35. 
Kelly, W. R. (2001). "An Evaluation of the Changing Lives Through Literature Program: Brazoria County CSCD."  Evaluation submitted to Lawrence Jablecki, Director of the Brazoria County Community Supervision and Corrections Department.
McLellan, K, Suellentrop, T. (December 2007). Serving teens doing time. Voice Youth Advocates. 30(5), 403-407. 
O'Connell, K. (2006, Fall). Fifteen Years of Changing Lives Through Literature. Massachusetts Foundation for the Humanities.
Schutt, R.K., Deng, X., Stoehr, T. (July 12, 2011). Changing Lives Through Literature: Bibliotherapy and Recidivism among Probationers.  University of Massachusetts Boston.  Working Paper.
Trounstine, J. (Winter 2007). Texts as Teachers: Shakespeare Behind Bars and Changing Lives Through Literature. New Directions for Adult & Continuing Education. Wiley. (116), 65-77. 
Trounstine, J. (2010). Booking It beyond the Big House. In R. Solinger (Ed.), Interrupted Life: Experiences of Incarcerated Women in the United States (pp. 419–425).  University of California Press. .
Using Steinbeck, Hemingway and Others as Parole Officers. (1993, Oct 6). The New York Times, B1.
Waxler, R. P. (May 2008). Changing Lives through Literature. PMLA. 123 (3), 678-682.

External links
Official site

Bibliotherapy
Penology
University of Massachusetts Dartmouth
1991 establishments in Massachusetts